Västerstrands AIK is a sports club in Karlstad, Sweden. The club was founded on 11 October 1940 and currently only runs a women's bandy team.

The women's bandy team has won the Swedish national championship six times, in 1991, 1992, 1994, 1997, 2001, and 2002, the same number of times as local competitor IF Boltic, and has also been the runner-up a couple of times. The team colours are black and yellow.

References

External links 
 Västerstrands AIK 

Bandy clubs in Sweden
Bandy clubs established in 1940
Sport in Karlstad
1940 establishments in Sweden